The Coat of arms of Penang is largely based on the coat of arms of Penang first granted to the Settlement (now State) of Penang, then in the Federation of Malaya, by a Royal Warrant of King George VI dated 11 September 1949.

Between 1911 (the date of a previous Royal Warrant) and 1946, when the colony of the Straits Settlements was dissolved, the Settlement was represented in the Straits Settlements' coat of arms by the second quarter, Argent on a mount an areca nut palm tree Proper. The Areca-nut palm is the tree from which Penang (Pulau Pinang, Malay: "Areca-nut-palm Island") derives its name.

Settlement and state arms

The coat of arms as granted was blazoned:

Shield: Barry wavy of eight Azure and Argent upon a chief crenellée Or a plume of three ostrich feathers surmounted by a riband of the First on the riband the words Ich Dien in letters of the Third

Crest: On a wreath of the Colours upon a mount a Pinang or Areca-nut palm leaved and fructed Proper.

The Prince of Wales's feathers and the motto Ich Dien referred to the fact that Penang was founded in 1786 as the Prince of Wales Island, while the blue and white bars are in reference to the Malacca Straits that surround Penang Island, separating it from Province Wellesley (now Seberang Perai) on the mainland.

The Areca-nut palm on the crest represents the origins of the Island's name.

The motto Bersatu dan Setia (Malay: "United and Loyal") was adopted by the Settlement Council of Penang in 1950. As this was during the height of the Penang secessionist movement, the motto may have implied loyalty to the British crown, rather than to the Federation of Malaya. Penang also has an unofficial motto, "Let Penang Lead".

Present-day state arms
Subsequently, after the construction of the Penang Bridge from 1982 to 1985, the state coat of arms was changed to the present design, which can be blazoned as:

Shield: Barry wavy of ten Azure and Argent upon a chief Or a depiction of the Penang Bridge Proper

Crest: On a wreath of the Colours upon a mount a Pinang or Areca-nut palm leaved and fructed Proper

Motto: "Bersatu dan Setia".

Historical state arms

City council arms

George Town City Council

The arms of the Municipal Council (from 1 January 1957, City Council) of George Town were granted by the English College of Arms on 4 September 1953, based on the arms of the Settlement of Penang:

Shield: Barry wavy of eight Azure and Argent a plume of three ostrich feathers Proper tied with a riband Or a chief embattled of the Last

Crest: On a helmet [to the dexter], mantled Azure doubled Argent, on a wreath of the Colours issuant from a wreath of palm Vert a lion passant guardant Azure

Motto: "Leading We Serve"

The motto is a combination of the motto of the Prince of Wales, Ich Dien (I serve), and the unofficial motto of Penang, "Let Penang Lead".

Penang Island City Council

In 1974, the George Town City Council was merged with the Penang Island Rural District Council to form the Penang Island Municipal Council (now Penang Island City Council). The arms of the municipality is displayed on a native shield and contains much local symbolism, but generally conforms to traditional English heraldic principles, and may be blazoned as follows.

Shield: Barry wavy of eight Azure and Argent a chief embattled Or overall a Pinang or areca-nut palm leaved and fructed Proper

Crest: On a wreath of the Colours mantled Vert doubled Or a crescent therefrom issuant a mullet of the Last

Supporters: On a compartment of waves barry wavy Azure and Argent issuant therefrom a mount Vert two dolphins hauriant torqued of the First finned Or

Motto: "Memimpin Sambil Berkhidmat" (Malay: "Leading We Serve")

The municipal arms is retained by the Penang Island City Council when it was accorded city status for the entire Penang Island in 2015, hence succeeding the Municipal Council.

Notes

Penang
Penang
Penang
Penang
Penang
1949 establishments in Malaya